Suppasit Jongcheveevat, nicknamed Mew, is a Thai actor, singer-songwriter, producer and CEO of Mew Suppasit Studio. He is known for his role as Tharn in TharnType: The Series. He is the first Thai artist to have entered Billboard's World Digital Song Sales chart, with five of his songs making it to the top 10.Early life and education

Suppasit was born on 21 February 1991. He graduated secondary school from Kasetsart University Laboratory School.

For his Bachelor's degree, Suppasit studied at Kasetsart University, majoring in  industrial engineering where he graduated with First-Class Honors (Gold medal). He continued to pursue his Master's degree in industrial engineering at Chulalongkorn University where he also served as a Teaching Assistant in statistics under the university's Faculty of Engineering. Currently, he is studying for his PhD degree in industrial engineering at Chulalongkorn University.

 Career 

 Acting 
Suppasit initially started out in the entertainment industry by appearing in various commercial advertisements and music videos. He was also cast in the Thai version of the Australian mock-dating reality show Taken Out, Take Me Out Thailand and its spin-off show Take Me Out Reality. Suppasit then began his acting career in the Thai boys' love (BL) series I Am Your King in 2017. The following year, he was cast in his first main role in the BL series, What The Duck: The Series (2018), as "Pree". Due to the series' popularity, it was confirmed that a second season would start filming. What The Duck 2: The Final Call, premiered on March 18, 2019, on LINE TV.

In early 2019, it was announced that Suppasit would star as "Tharn" - one of the main protagonists of GMM One's and LINE TV's TharnType: The Series. The series immediately gained attention within Thailand as well as international audiences. Suppasit and his co-star Kanawut won "Best Kiss Scene" at the 2020 LINE TV Awards for a scene in TharnType: The Series and they were also the first BL couple to appear in the February issue of Harper's Bazaar Thailand. With the positive response to TharnType, a second season for the series titled Tharntype The Series 2: 7 Years of Love was announced and it premiered on November 6, 2020.

In 2021, Suppasit starred in a short action film titled Undefeated by Garena Free Fire Thailand, along with Urassaya Sperbund and Luke Voyage. Suppasit also played the lead role of "Maen" in the mini-series Super แม้น (Super Maen) under the Drama For All project by Thai PBS. The project aimed to expand a communication boundary in the society, giving everyone equal access including the visually impaired and people with hearing disabilities.

Suppasit is set to star in the drama Bad Love to be broadcast on One31 together with Davika Hoorne and Jes Jespipat, will also star in the romantic comedy series Love Me Again by VIU Thailand with Lapassalan Jiravechsoontornkul and The Ocean Eyes, a series about the life of marine veterinarians, where he will also serve as the executive producer along with global filmmakers Rick McCallum of the Star Wars prequel trilogy, Herbert Primig and screenwriter Henry Gilroy as well as the Korean-Thai collaboration BL drama Love Is Like A Cat, with members of the South Korean boy band Just B, JM and Geonu, and Korean actor Kim Kyoung Seok.

 Music 
Suppasit made his official debut as a singer upon the release of his first single titled "Season of You" on August 1, 2020. The song and music video were launched through a global press conference with the hashtag #SeasonOfYouGlobalPress trending number 1 on Twitter worldwide and in 16 other locations. It became the most tweeted hashtag on that day with over 1.2 million tweets.

He went on to release other singles namely Nan Na (ft. NiceCNX), Good Day, THANOS, written and produced by Wan Thanakrit, and his first self-composed song, Summer Fireworks.

On 1 August 2021, in celebration of the first anniversary of his official debut as a singer, Suppasit released his debut album titled "365" together with the music video of the album's promotional single, "Drowning". The album ranked at #3 on the worldwide iTunes album chart. It charted at # 1 in 18 countries, also entering the top 100 charts in 43 locations. With the success of the album, Suppasit became the first and only Thai artist to debut an album that reached # 13 on iTunes' Global Digital Artist Ranking. Five of the songs from the album made it to Billboard's World Digital Song Sales chart where the song "Drowning" rose to No. 4, closely followed by "Missing You" ft. Zom Marie (No. 5), "Let Me Be" ft. Autta (No. 6), "More and More" (No. 7) and finally "Time Machine" (No. 8). Suppasit is the first Thai artist to have entered this chart.

On 5 October 2021, Mew Suppasit Studio launched the "Global Collaboration Project" wherein Suppasit will be working and doing music collaborations with various international artists. The first single under this project is SPACEMAN, produced and written by English electronic music duo HONNE. Suppasit did the first live performance of the song at the annual Asia Song Festival 2021, where he was chosen as the representative artist of Thailand. Upon its release on iTunes, SPACEMAN entered the charts in over 40 locations and went up to #1 in 20 locations. It was also # 7 in the worldwide iTunes song chart. SPACEMAN made it to Billboard's Hot Trending Songs chart for 8 consecutive weeks, peaking at #2 in the weekly chart and #1 in the 24-hour chart, making Suppasit the first Thai and Southeast Asian act to enter the said chart.

For the second part of his Global Collaboration Project, Suppasit worked with Korean singer-songwriter Sam Kim who, aside from featuring in the song, also wrote and produced their collaboration single titled "Before 4:30 (She Said...)". It entered the iTunes song chart in 53 locations, peaking at #1 in 21 countries, breaking Suppasit's previous record with SPACEMAN. Additionally, the song also made it to #1 in the iTunes R&B song chart in 41 locations including the USA and #10 in the worldwide iTunes song chart. The music video, starring Suppasit and Kim alongside Miss Universe Thailand 2021 Anchilee Scott-Kemmis, was officially launched through a press conference held at River Park, ICONSIAM on December 20, 2021. The livestream of the press conference amassed over 2.9 million views in the Chinese microblogging website Weibo.Before 4:30 (She Said...) launched on two genre-specific Billboard charts at the same time as well as in the Hot Trending Songs chart. The song debuted at No. 4 on the R&B Digital Song Sales chart and at No. 8 on the R&B/Hip-Hop Digital Song Sales chart. Suppasit is the first Thai artist to achieve this feat.

On 25 February 2021, Suppasit released a music video for his cover of Ed Sheeran's Afterglow. The music video was criticized by online social media users for its similarity to another music video done by NCT's Jaehyun on his cover of I Like Me Better by Lauv. Suppasit later retracted the said video and held a press conference to acknowledge the similarity while denying that it was intentional. In November 2021, Suppasit and his studio filed a prosecution case against 10 people online for defamation and violation of Computer Act.

 Mew Suppasit Studio and other works 
On 5 May 2020, a management team was launched under the name Mew Suppasit Studio'', wherein Suppasit himself is the CEO. The team will be in charge of future official appearances regarding Suppasit and his endeavors.

In September 2020, Suppasit appeared on the cover of Cosmopolitan Indonesia for their 23rd anniversary issue. He is the first male to be on the cover of Cosmopolitan Indonesia as well as the first Thai male to appear on the cover of ELLE Thailand magazine.

Suppasit, along with June Teeratee, served as the MC of Workpoint TV's music program T-Pop Stage from its opening stage on February 8, 2021 until April 5, 2021.

Endorsements 
Suppasit is the current brand ambassador of Skechers Thailand since 2020 and one of the ambassadors of Candy Home Appliances since 2021. He was a campaign ambassador for Shopee Thailand, and a presenter for Playmore Thailand and Garena Free Fire Thailand. He was also named as the Brand Friend and presenter of TARO Fish Snack and the cosmetics brand Yves Rocher Thailand.

In 2022, Suppasit was chosen as the representative of the young generation in Thailand for Asia-Pacific Economic Cooperation (APEC). He was also announced as the newest brand ambassador for CP Brand (Chili Pork Bologna) as well as the new presenter for Gangnam Clinic's Pure Whitening Cream. In September, on the occasion of the 5th anniversary of the online shopping application ThisShop, Suppasit was introduced as their new brand ambassador.

Filmography

Film

Television

TV and variety shows

Music video appearances

Discography

Singles

Studio albums

Music projects

Soundtrack appearances

Awards and nominations

References 

1991 births
Living people
Suppasit Jongcheveevat
Suppasit Jongcheveevat
Suppasit Jongcheveevat
Suppasit Jongcheveevat